Pukayuq (Quechua puka red, -yuq a suffix, "the one with red color", hispanicized spelling Pucayoc) is a mountain in the Willkanuta mountain range in the Andes of Peru, about  high. It is situated in the Cusco Region, Quispicanchi Province, Marcapata District. Pukayuq lies south of Q'illu Wallayuq, northeast of Wila Jaqhi and Yayamari and southeast of Yana Urqu.

References 

Mountains of Cusco Region
Mountains of Peru